Harrisville Historic District is a national historic district located at Harrisville, Ritchie County, West Virginia. The district encompasses 111 contributing buildings, 1 contributing site, and 15 contributing structures in Harrisville.  It includes residential, commercial, and governmental buildings dating from the mid-19th through mid-20th century.  They are in variety of popular architectural styles including Gothic Revival, Late Victorian, Colonial Revival, and Tudor Revival. Notable buildings include the Heritage Inn (c. 1930), the Lowther Building (c. 1910), Lowther House (1948), the Trading Post, the Deem Building, the Lawrence Building (c. 1898), railroad passenger depot (c. 1910), St. Luke's United Methodist Church (c. 1895), Harrisville Church of Christ (c. 1925), Stout
Hardware, and Berdine's 5&10 Variety Store (1915).  Located in the district are the separately listed Ritchie County Courthouse and the Harrisville Grade School.

It was listed on the National Register of Historic Places in 2011.

References

Historic districts on the National Register of Historic Places in West Virginia
Buildings and structures in Ritchie County, West Virginia
National Register of Historic Places in Ritchie County, West Virginia